Deganga Assembly constituency is an assembly constituency in North 24 Parganas district in the Indian state of West Bengal.

Overview
As per orders of the Delimitation Commission, No. 120 Deganga Assembly constituency is composed of the following: Kadambagachhi and Katra gram panchayats of Barasat I community development block, and Amulia, Berachampa I, Berachampa II, Chakla, Chaurasi, Hadipur Jhikra I, Kalsur, Nur Nagar and Sohai-Shwetpur gram panchayats of Deganga community development block.

Deganga Assembly constituency is part of No. 17 Barasat (Lok Sabha constituency).

Members of Legislative Assembly

Election results

2021

2016

2011

1977-2006
In the 2006 state assembly elections, Dr. Mortoza Hossain of AIFB won the Deganga assembly seat defeating Mafidul Haque Sahaji of AITC. Contests in most years were multi cornered but only winners and runners are being mentioned. Md. Yakub of Forward Bloc defeated Abdur Rouf of Trinamool Congress in 2001, Idris Ali of Congress in 1996, and Ashanullah of Congress in 1991. A.K.M. Hassan Uzzaman of IUML defeated Dr. Mortoza Hossain of Forward Bloc in 1987. Dr. Mortoza Hossain of Forward Bloc defeated A.K.M. Hassan Uzzaman of IUML in 1982. A.K.M. Hassan Uzzaman of IUML defeated Md. Yakub of Forward Bloc in 1977.

1951-1972
M. Shaukat Ali of Congress won in 1972. Harun-Or-Rashid Independent/Progressive Muslim League won in 1971 and 1969. J.Kabir of Bangla Congress won in 1967. Maulana Bazlur Rahman Durgapuri of Congress won in 1962. Rafiuddin Ahmed and Atul Krishna Roy, both of Congress, won the Deganaga joint seat in 1957. In independent India's first election in 1951, Rafiuddin Ahmed of Congress won the Deganga seat.

References

Assembly constituencies of West Bengal
Politics of North 24 Parganas district